Ross Brown (born 10 June 1993) is a Scottish footballer who plays as a midfielder for Dundonald Bluebell.

Career
Brown started his career in the youth academy of East Fife and made his professional debut as 65th a substitute replacing Steve Hislop in a 3-0 defeat to Dumbarton on 12 November 2011.He went on to make 117 appearances for the club before earning a move into full-time football with Livingston.

He was brought to Livi by then manager David Hopkin in 2017.By this point, the Almondvale side were having a resurgence in fortunes after a fairly miserable few years.  Brown found it difficult to make an impact in West Lothian and eventually left the club without making a single first team appearance.

In 2018, he signed for Airdrieonians until the end of the season.  Brown made 9 appearances for the Diamonds before being released.

Brown signed for Berwick Rangers in the summer of 2018 and made 30 appearances in one season for the Wee Gers.

After just 21 appearances in two years at Brechin, Brown dropped into the junior leagues and signed for Dundonald Bluebell in 2021.

References

External links
Ross Brown on Soccerbase

1993 births
Living people
Scottish footballers
Scottish Football League players
Association football midfielders
Livingston F.C. players
Berwick Rangers F.C. players
East Fife F.C. players
Airdrieonians F.C. players
Brechin City F.C. players
Dundonald Bluebell F.C. players
Footballers from Dunfermline